Mistral was a  (torpilleur d'escadre) built for the French Navy during the 1920s.

Design and description
They were powered by two geared steam turbines, each driving one propeller shaft, using steam provided by three du Temple boilers.

The main armament of the Bourrasque-class ships consisted of four Canon de  Modèle 1919 guns in shielded single mounts, one superfiring pair each fore and aft of the superstructure. Their anti-aircraft (AA) armament consisted of a single Canon de  Modèle 1924 gun. The ships carried two triple mounts of  torpedo tubes amidships. A pair of depth charge chutes were built into their stern that housed a total of sixteen  depth charges.

Construction and career
When France surrendered to Germany in June 1940 during World War II, Mistral sought refuge at Plymouth Dockyard in Devon, England. On 3 July 1940, the British executed Operation Catapult, in which they seized or destroyed French warships in French and British ports to prevent them from falling into German or Vichy French hands. That day, Mistral was partially scuttled at Plymouth during the operation. The British later salvaged her and placed her in Royal Navy service as HMS Mistral.

Operating with the Free French Naval Forces in support of the Allied invasion of Normandy, Mistral was damaged by German artillery fire in the English Channel off Quinéville, Manche, France, on 10 June 1944. She was declared a constructive total loss.

Notes

References

 
 

Bourrasque-class destroyers
Maritime incidents in July 1940
Maritime incidents in June 1944
Naval ships of Operation Neptune
Ships built in France
World War II destroyers of France
1925 ships